The Union of the Democratic Centre (UCD, also translated as "Democratic Centre Union") was an electoral alliance, and later political party, in Spain, existing from 1977 to 1983. It was initially led by Adolfo Suárez.

History
The coalition, in fact a federation of parties, was formed on 3 May 1977, during the transition to democracy from the dictatorship of Francisco Franco, with the involvement of leaders from a variety of newly formed centrist and rightist factions, under the leadership of Suárez, then Prime Minister. The principal components of the UCD defined themselves as Christian democrats, liberals, social democrats, or "independents", the latter frequently comprising conservative elements which had been part of the Franco regime.

The parties that made the UCD coalition were:

 Christian democrats:
 Christian Democratic Party (PDC) of Fernando Álvarez de Miranda and Íñigo Cavero.
 Social democrats:
 Social Democratic Federation (FSD) of José Ramón Lasuén Sancho. It comprised ten regional parties.
 Social Democratic Party (PSD) of Francisco Fernández Ordóñez and Rafael Arias-Salgado. It comprised six regional parties.
 Independent Social Democratic Party (PSI) of Gonzalo Casado.
 Spanish Social Democratic Union (USDE) of Eurico de la Peña.
 Governmentalists:
 People's Party (PP) of Pío Cabanillas, Emilio Attard and José Pedro Pérez Llorca. It comprised seven regional parties.
 Liberals:
 Federation of Democratic and Liberal Parties (FPDL) of Joaquín Garrigues Walker and Antonio Fontán. It comprised nine regional parties.
 People's Democratic Party (PDP) of Ignacio Camuñas Solís.
 Liberal Party (PL) of Enrique Larroque.
 Liberal Progressive Party (PPL) of Juan García Madariaga.
 Regional parties:
 Extremaduran Regional Action (AREX) of Enrique Sánchez de León.
 Independent Galician Party (PGI) of José Luis Meilán.
 Andalusian Social Liberal Party (PSLA) of Manuel Clavero.
 Canarian Union (UC) of Lorenzo Olarte.
 Murcian Democratic Union (UDM) of Antonio Pérez Crespo.
 Later the Independent Social Federation (FSI) of Jesús Sancho Rof was also added to the coalition.

Some months later, all these parties were merged and UCD constituted itself as a party on 4 August 1977.

The UCD governed Spain until December 1982. In the elections of 15 June 1977, the party took 34.4% of the vote and 166 seats of the 350 in the Congress of Deputies. The party governed as a minority and worked with all major parties in the Congress, including the rightist People's Alliance and the parties of the left, the Spanish Socialist Workers' Party (PSOE) and Communists (PCE). Suárez became the first democratically chosen prime minister of Spain after the Franco period. The UCD played a major role in writing the new constitution, as three of the seven members of the constitutional drafting commission, established after those elections, came from the party. In March 1979 the UCD again won the general election but could not attain a majority, with 34.8% of the vote and 168 deputies.

Demise
The demise of the UCD began when in 1979 the Socialist Party moderated its outlook by dropping the references to Marxism from its programme. At the same time, the right-wing People's Alliance increasingly oriented to the political centre and, by undergoing a generation change, could overcome its Francoist image. Thus, the space for the centrist UCD shrank. Despite this, the UCD was returned for a second term in 1979, with a slight increase in vote share.

Internal divisions
The fundamental reason for the party's disappearance was internal conflict between its diverse factions, which led to the resignation of Suárez as prime minister in January 1981. Suárez was replaced by Leopoldo Calvo Sotelo for the remainder of the term of the Cortes. Many believe that the only factor that had kept the party together was the writing of the constitution. With that work done, the party became increasingly unpopular due to the growth of unemployment, inflation and the general economic crisis affecting the country.

Splits and defections 1980–1982
During the course of the 1979–1982 legislature the party suffered a number of serious splits and defections. On 7 March 1980, Joaquim Molins resigned from the UCD group and later joined the Catalan Nationalist Convergence and Union. On 25 April 1980, Manuel Clavero resigned from the party in disputes over the statute of autonomy for Andalusia. Two months later, José García Pérez resigned over the same issue. García joined the Andalusian Socialist Party on 1 September 1981.

On 10 November 1981 Manuel Díaz-Piniés resigned from the party and 1 February 1982 he, together with three other deputies Miguel Herrero de Miñón, Ricardo de la Cierva and Francisco Soler Valero joined the Popular Alliance (AP). The first of a number of breakaway parties emerged three days later on 4 February 1982 when 10 UCD deputies from the left of the party - Francisco Fernández Ordóñez, Antonio Alfonso Quirós, Luis Berenguer, Carmela García Moreno, Ciriaco Díaz Porras, Luis González Seara, Eduardo Moreno, Javier Moscoso, María Dolores Pelayo and Carmen Solano formed the Democratic Action Party (Partido de Acción Democrática/PAD). This group stood as part of the PSOE list in the 1982 election and merged with the PSOE in January 1983.

In Summer 1982 the party splintered further. Two deputies Modesto Fraile and Carlos Gila quit the party and in August they along with 11 other UCD deputies (Óscar Alzaga, Mariano Alierta, Joaquín Galant, Julen Guimon, María Josefa Lafuente, José Luis Moreno, Francisco Olivencia, José Manuel Otero, José Pin Arboledas, José Luis Ruiz Navarro and Luis Vega) formed the People's Democratic Party (PDP). This party allied itself with the AP for the 1982 election.

Also in August, 16 deputies, headed by the former leader and Prime Minister Adolfo Suarez formed the Democratic and Social Centre (CDS). Among the founding members were deputies such as Agustín Rodríguez Sahagún, Jaume Barnola, León Buil, Rafael Calvo Ortega, José María Mesa, Josep Pujadas, José Javier Rodríguez Alcaide and Manuel de Sàrraga and Alejandro Rebollo Álvarez-Amandi. The CDS fought the 1982 election in direct competition with the UCD.

Although the UCD had been joined by José María de Areilza and Antoni de Senillosa, who had defected from the AP, the UCD party group had now been reduced to 124 deputies - 52 short of a majority. The PSOE at this point had 118 deputies and could also count on the support of the 10 deputies of the PAD and the 21 members of the Communist Party. In light of this new situation in Parliament, Calvo Sotelo called fresh elections.

1982 election and disbanding
Following the attempted coup of 1981, the socialists convincingly won the 1982 general election. The UCD, presenting Landelino Lavilla Alsina as its candidate for prime minister, was nearly wiped out, taking only 6.7% of the vote and 11 seats, losing over 100 of their sitting deputies—one of the worst defeats ever suffered by a western European governing party.  The CDS also fared poorly, with only two of its sixteen sitting deputies winning seats.

Most of the UCD's electorate became supporters of the AP-PDP alliance, which later became the People's Party, today Spain's principal conservative party. The AP-PDP displaced the UCD as the main alternative to the PSOE.

Many ex-ministers and leaders of the UCD also joined the AP ranks. Subsequently, the UCD was disbanded on 18 February 1983.

Electoral performance

Cortes Generales

Regional parliaments

Literature

See also
Politics of Spain
Spanish transition to democracy
José Larrañaga Arenas

References

 
Defunct political party alliances in Spain
Defunct liberal political parties
Liberal parties in Spain
Centrist parties in Spain
Political parties established in 1977
Political parties disestablished in 1983
1977 establishments in Spain
1983 disestablishments in Spain